Herman Schopp (28 June 1899 – 8 August 1954) was a cinematographer of the Frank Buck serial Jungle Menace.

Early years
Schopp was born in Radzichower, Austria (now Radziejów, Poland). He immigrated to the US (New York City) 29 August 1907.

Career
Schopp was cinematographer of The Mysterious Pilot, Son of Ingagi, The Secret of Treasure Island, and many other films. He was a World War II veteran.

Work with Frank Buck
In 1937, Schopp was a cinematographer of the Frank Buck serial Jungle Menace.

Death
Schopp died of heart failure while filming an Errol Flynn movie, Il Maestro di Don Giovanni, in Santa Marinella, Italy. A brother and a sister survived him. His ashes are interred in Beth Olam Cemetery in Los Angeles.

References

External links
 

1899 births
1954 deaths
American cinematographers
Polish emigrants to the United States
Burials at Hollywood Forever Cemetery
Austro-Hungarian emigrants to the United States